Aleksandra Golovkina (born 1 July 1998) is a Lithuanian figure skater. She is the 2014 CS Warsaw Cup bronze medalist and a six-time Lithuanian national champion (2012, 2013, 2016, 2019, 2022, 2023). She has qualified to the free skate at three European Championships.

Career 
Golovkina competed internationally on the novice level from 2008–09 to 2011–12. Her ISU Junior Grand Prix (JGP) debut came in August 2012. In March 2013, she competed at the 2013 World Junior Championships in Milan but was eliminated after placing 39th in the short program.

Golovkina began the 2013–14 season on the JGP series, placing 16th in Estonia. In November 2013, she won the junior bronze medal at the NRW Trophy before making her senior international debut at the Warsaw Cup; she placed 9th in the short program, 1st in the free skate, and 4th overall in Warsaw. Continuing on the senior level, she finished 4th at the 2014 Toruń Cup and 5th at the Hellmut Seibt Memorial.

In the 2014–15 season, Golovkina competed at one JGP event and then won her first senior international medal, silver, at the Ice Star in Minsk, Belarus. In November 2014, she began competing on the ISU Challenger Series (CS), placing 5th at the Volvo Open Cup before taking bronze at the Warsaw Cup. She placed 7th at her final CS event, the 2014 Golden Spin of Zagreb. Golovkina was named in Lithuania's team to the 2015 European Championships in Stockholm, Sweden. Ranked 23rd in the short program, she qualified for the free skate, where she placed 17th, lifting her to 19th overall.

Programs

Competitive highlights 
CS: Challenger Series; JGP: Junior Grand Prix

2012–13 to present

2008–09 to 2011–12

References

External links 
 

1998 births
Living people
Lithuanian female single skaters
Sportspeople from Vilnius
21st-century Lithuanian women